Liliana Blum (born 1974) is a Mexican short story writer. She is one of the first Mexican writers of her generation to be translated into English.

Biography
Liliana Blum was born in Durango, Mexico, in 1974. Blum received her bachelor's degree in Comparative literature from the University of Kansas and her master's degree from Tec de Monterrey.

She is the author of the novels El monstruo pentápodo (Tusquets Editores, 2017) and Pandora (Tusquets Editores, 2015), as well of the novelle Residuos de espanto (Ficticia Editores 2013) and the short story collections No me pases de largo (Literal Publications, 2013), Yo sé cuando expira la leche (IMAC Durango, 2011), El libro perdido de Heinrich Böll (Editorial Jus, 2008), Vidas de catálogo (Fondo Editorial Tierra Adentro, 2007),  ¿En qué se nos fue la mañana? (Institituto Tamaulipeco para la Cultura y las Artes, 2007),  La maldición de Eva (Ediciones de Barlovento, 2003), and  The Curse of Eve and Other Stories (Host Publications, 2008), translated by Toshiya Kamei. English translations of her stories have appeared in various literary journals, including Eclectica, Mslexia, storySouth, Blackbird, and The Dirty Goat.

The Curse of Eve and Other Stories is Blum's first book to appear in English. It contains 24 stories, most of which have female protagonists.

Writers who influenced her work include Rosario Castellanos, Margaret Atwood, and Bret Easton Ellis.

In 2005, her story "Kisses on the Forehead" was selected for storySouths Million Writers Award Notable Stories.

Bibliography
The Curse of Eve and Other Stories translated by Toshiya Kamei (Host Publications ; casebound and 978-0-924047-54-1; trade paper)

External links
Blum's blog
Eve Gil's article about Blum (originally published in Excélsior)

1974 births
Living people
Mexican women writers
Mexican women short story writers
Mexican short story writers
Mexican bloggers
People from Durango
University of Kansas alumni
Mexican women bloggers